Ternatus is a genus of East Asian sheet weavers that was first described by N. Sun, B. Li & L. H. Tu in 2012.<ref name=Sun2012>{{cite journal| last1=Sun| first1=N.| last2=Li| first2=B.| last3=Tu| first3=L. H.| year=2012| title=Ternatus, a new spider genus from China with a cladistic analysis and comments on its phylogenetic placement (Araneae: Linyphiidae)| journal=Zootaxa| pages=28–54| volume=3358| doi=10.11646/zootaxa.3358.1.2}}</ref>  it contains only two species, both found in China: T. malleatus and T. siculus''.

See also
 List of Linyphiidae species (Q–Z)

References

Araneomorphae genera
Linyphiidae
Spiders of China